Josh Thomas (born 1 October 1991) is a retired Australian rules footballer who played for the Collingwood Football Club in the Australian Football League (AFL).

Thomas, a Queensland Under 18 representative in the 2009 AFL National Under 18 Championships, was drafted by Collingwood with the 75th selection in the 2009 AFL Draft.

In 2009, Thomas played 11 games for Gold Coast in the TAC Cup. Thomas was offered a contract by Gold Coast, but chose to enter the 2009 AFL draft, stating that he wanted to join an AFL environment as soon as possible, rather than wait for Gold Coast to join the AFL in 2011.

Thomas, along with teammate Lachlan Keeffe, tested positive to the banned substance clenbuterol in drug tests taken in February 2015. Both players accepted provisional suspensions in March 2015. On 10 August 2015 Thomas accepted his two-year ban from the tribunal and that day was delisted by Collingwood but was told he'd be re-drafted as a rookie for the 2017 season if still available in the draft. He was banned from AFL competition until 9 February 2017. Thomas worked as an Uber driver in Queensland whilst he was serving his ban.

On 27 November 2015, Thomas and his teammate Lachlan Keeffe were re-drafted to Collingwood through the rookie draft.

On 14 October 2021, Thomas retired from football.

Statistics
 Statistics are correct to the end of the 2021 season

|- style="background-color: #eaeaea"
! scope="row" style="text-align:center" | 2010
|  || 24 || 0 || — || — || — || — || — || — || — || — || — || — || — || — || — || —
|- 
! scope="row" style="text-align:center" | 2011
|  || 24 || 0 || — || — || — || — || — || — || — || — || — || — || — || — || — || —
|- style="background-color: #eaeaea"
! scope="row" style="text-align:center" | 2012
|  || 24 || 0 || — || — || — || — || — || — || — || — || — || — || — || — || — || —
|- 
! scope="row" style="text-align:center" | 2013
|  || 24 || 19 || 11 || 8 || 198 || 166 || 363 || 65 || 62 || 0.6 || 0.4 || 10.4 || 8.7 || 19.1 || 3.4 || 3.3
|- style="background-color: #eaeaea"
! scope="row" style="text-align:center" | 2014
|  || 24 || 13 || 8 || 3 || 124 || 100 || 224 || 33 || 51 || 0.6 || 0.2 || 9.5 || 7.7 || 17.2 || 2.5 || 3.9

|- 
! scope="row" style="text-align:center" | 2017
|  || 24 || 9 || 6 || 5 || 69 || 79 || 148 || 29 || 25 || 0.7 || 0.6 || 7.7 || 8.8 || 16.4 || 3.2 || 2.8
|- style="background-color: #eaeaea"
! scope="row" style="text-align:center" | 2018
|  || 24 || 26 || 38 || 13 || 223 || 208 || 431 || 86 || 80 || 1.5 || 0.5 || 8.6 || 8.0 || 16.6 || 3.3 || 3.1
|- 
! scope="row" style="text-align:center" | 2019
|  || 24 || 22 || 22 || 11 || 157 || 159 || 316 || 65 || 52 || 1.0 || 0.5 || 7.1 || 7.2 || 14.4 || 3.0 || 2.4
|- style="background-color: #eaeaea"
! scope="row" style="text-align:center" | 2020
|  || 24 || 14 || 4 || 4 || 70 || 78 || 148 || 26 || 28 || 0.3 || 0.3 || 5.0 || 5.6 || 10.6 || 1.9 || 2.0
|- 
! scope="row" style="text-align:center" | 2021
|  || 24 || 20 || 12 || 9 || 148 || 118 || 266 || 66 || 51 || 0.6 || 0.5 || 7.4 || 5.9 || 13.3 || 3.3 || 2.6
|- class="sortbottom"
! colspan=3| Career
! 123
! 101
! 53
! 989
! 907
! 1896
! 370
! 349
! 0.8
! 0.4
! 8.0
! 7.4
! 15.4
! 3.0
! 2.8
|}

Notes

References

External links

 
 

1991 births
Living people
Collingwood Football Club players
Redland Football Club players
Australian rules footballers from Queensland
Doping cases in Australian rules football